Blueweed or blue weed is a common name for several plants and may refer to:

Chicory, Cichorium intybus
Echium vulgare, native to Europe and western and central Asia
Helianthus ciliaris